A one-man band is a musician who plays a number of musical instruments simultaneously using their body and various mechanical contraptions.

One Man Band may also refer to:

Film
The One-Man Band, a 1900 short film by Georges Méliès
One Man Band (film), a 2005 Pixar short film
One Man Band (unfinished film), an unfinished short film made by Orson Welles between 1968 and 1971

Music

Albums
One Man Band (Ronnie Dyson album), 1973, and the title track "One Man Band (Plays All Alone)"
One Man Band (James Taylor album), 2007

Songs
"One Man Band" (Three Dog Night song), 1970
"One Man Band" (Roger Daltrey song), 1973, written by Leo Sayer
"One Man Band" (Old Dominion song), 2019
"One Man Band", a song on Jack Savoretti's single "Gypsy Love"
"One Man Band", a song by Status Quo on the album Rock 'til You Drop

Other uses
A television reporter who works without a support crew, also known as a video journalist
A self-proclaimed nickname of Heath Slater

See also
One Man Band Man, a 2007 Swizz Beatz album